Cumpadials is the smallest of the four villages in the municipality of Sumvitg, Graubünden, Switzerland. It has a station on the Disentis - Reichenau line of the Rhätische Bahn railway.

References

External links
 Sumvitg municipality

Villages in Graubünden
Sumvitg